Fanny Horn Birkeland (née Fanny Welle-Strand Horn; born 8 March 1988) is a Norwegian former biathlete. She competed at the Biathlon World Championships 2011, where she placed sixth in the relay with the Norwegian team. In January 2015, she won her first race in the 7.5 km sprint in Ruhpolding, Germany.

References

External links
 
 
 
 
 

1988 births
Living people
Skiers from Oslo
Norwegian female biathletes
Biathlon World Championships medalists
Biathletes at the 2014 Winter Olympics
Olympic biathletes of Norway
Olympic bronze medalists for Norway
Olympic medalists in biathlon
Medalists at the 2014 Winter Olympics
21st-century Norwegian women